The naval Battle of Quilmes took place between a fleet of the Imperial Brazilian Navy, commanded by British admiral James Norton and a fleet of the United Provinces of the Río de la Plata under the command of William Brown. The confrontations began at dawn on July 30, 1826 and lasted for three hours.

Background
On the night of July 29, while an Argentine convoy of troops and military equipment carried out a crossing to the Banda Oriental, escorted by the Río de la Plata schooner that was commanded by captain Leonardo Rosales, admiral Brown, with a force integrated by the 25 de Mayo frigate (flagship), the Congreso, Independencia, Republica and General Balcarce brigs, the Sarandí schooner and other small ships in a total of 18, was in his usual base waiting for the convoy's arrival and left the port in an unsuccessful attempt to surprise the Brazilians.

The Brazilian fleet, commanded by captain Norton, was composed of the Niterói frigate, the corvettes Liberal, Maria da Glória, Maceió and Itaparica, the brigs Pirajá, Caboclo and 29 de Agosto, the schooners Leal Paulistana, Dona Paula, Conceição and 7 de Março and a few gunboats, with a total of more than 200 guns. From 8 o'clock onwards, the fleet continued to sail until midnight, when it anchored to the east of the outer channel, near Ensenada waiting for the return of the convoy to attack it, which it finally did near the coast of Quilmes.

Order of Battle

Empire of Brazil

United Provinces of the Río de la Plata

Battle
As Scheina puts it:

References

Citations

Bibliography

External links 
Ships of the United Provinces of the River Plate 
Historical Handbook of World Navies
Ships of War 
Article on the foreign origin of sailors involved in the Argentina-Brazil War 
Official site of the Argentine Navy 
Official site of Brazilian Navy 

Quilmes
1826 in Brazil
July 1826 events
1826 in Argentina
Conflicts in 1826